William Duckett (February 12, 1825 – September 19, 1887) was a merchant and political figure in Quebec. He represented Soulanges in the Legislative Assembly of the Province of Canada from 1863 to 1866 and in the Legislative Assembly of Quebec from 1878 to 1886 as a Conservative member.

Life
He was born in Montreal, the son of William Duckett and Marie-Monique Chevrier, and was educated there. Duckett became a merchant at Coteau-Landing. In 1848, he married Clémence-Iphigénie Prieur. He was defeated when he ran for reelection in 1886. Duckett died at Coteau-Landing at the age of 62.

References

1825 births
1887 deaths
Members of the Legislative Assembly of the Province of Canada from Canada East
Conservative Party of Quebec MNAs